is a former Japanese football player.

Club statistics

References

External links

1989 births
Living people
Association football people from Hyōgo Prefecture
Japanese footballers
J1 League players
J2 League players
Japan Football League players
Gamba Osaka players
Roasso Kumamoto players
Ventforet Kofu players
AC Nagano Parceiro players
Association football goalkeepers